Aldashin (also Romanized as Āldāshīn) is a village in the Ab-e Garm Rural District, Central District of Sareyn County, Ardabil Province, Iran. At the 2006 census, its population was 695 in 146 families.

References 

Tageo

Towns and villages in Sareyn County